Aleksandar Nikolov is a Bulgarian and Canadian theoretical computer scientist working on differential privacy, discrepancy theory, and high-dimensional geometry. He is a professor at the University of Toronto.

Nikolov obtained his Ph.D. from Rutgers University in 2014 under the supervision of S. Muthukrishnan (Thesis: New computational aspects of discrepancy theory).

Nikolov is the Canada Research Chair in Algorithms and Private Data Analysis.

References 

Living people
Canadian mathematicians
Canadian computer scientists
Year of birth missing (living people)